Kira Hall (born 1962, Birmingham, Alabama) is professor of Linguistics and Anthropology, as well as director for the Program in Culture, Language, and Social Practice (CLASP), at the University of Colorado at Boulder.

The majority of Hall's work focuses on language in India and the United States, with special attention to organizations of gender and sexuality.  A special focus of her work has been the linguistic and sociocultural practices of Hindi-speaking Hijras in northern India, a transgender group often discussed in the anthropological literature as a "third sex."

She is known for her contributions to research on language and identity within sociocultural linguistics, and especially the tactics of intersubjectivity framework developed with Mary Bucholtz.

Education 
Hall received her Ph.D. in Linguistics in 1995 from the University of California at Berkeley, writing her dissertation under the supervision of Robin Lakoff, and has held academic positions at Stanford, Yale, and Rutgers Universities.

Designations

Awards 
 College Scholar Award in 2014
 Provost Faculty Achievement Award in 2010
 Boulder Faculty Assembly Teaching Excellence Award in 2009
 Outstanding Faculty Advisor Award in 2004.

Positions held 
 President, Society for Linguistic Anthropology (2019–Present, as of 2021)
 Professor, UC Boulder Department of Linguistics
 Professor, UC Boulder Department of Anthropology
 UC Boulder Associate Chair Of Undergraduate Studies, Department Of Linguistics 
 Affiliated Faculty, UC Boulder College of Media, Communication, and Information (CMCI)
 Affiliated Faculty, UC Boulder Department Of Women And Gender Studies (WGST)
 Director, UC Boulder Program In Culture, Language, And Social Practice
 Director, UC Boulder Literacy Practicum

Selected publications

Books

Book chapters 
  Pdf.
  Pdf.

Journal articles 
  Pdf.
 Hall, Kira. 2013. "Commentary I: It's a hijra! Queer linguistics revisited." Discourse and Society 24: 634-642. doi:10.1177/0957926513490321

Edited Books 

 Hall, Kira; Barrett, Rusty, eds. 2018. Language and sexuality. Oxford Handbooks Online. DOI:10.1093/oxfordhb/9780190212926.001.0001

References

External links
 Kira Hall's home page (as of June 2021)
 Kira Hall's home page, archived 2006
 Program in Culture, Language and Social Practice

American anthropologists
Anthropology educators
Linguists from the United States
Living people
Rutgers University faculty
Sociolinguists
University of Colorado Boulder faculty
Stanford University Department of Linguistics faculty
University of California, Berkeley alumni
Yale University faculty
Women linguists
1962 births